This is a partial chronological list of cases decided by the United States Supreme Court during the Vinson Court, the tenure of Chief Justice Frederick Moore Vinson from June 24, 1946 through September 8, 1953.

References 

Vinson
List